Railways powered by electricity in Turkey comprised less than half of the network in 2020, but the aim is for over three-quarters by 2023. Along with these several Turkish cities operate rapid transit and tram system electrified with either overhead wire or third rail.

By 2013, the electrified lines reached to 2416 km. There is also 888 km of electrified high speed train network, which makes 3304 km in total.

History
The Turkish State Railways started an electrification plan in 1953. The plan was to first electrify important suburban lines in Istanbul and Ankara. The main reason for this was the many complaints of citizens living in the city about the pollution of the steam locomotives. The railways chose the standard 25 kV 50 Hz AC system to electrify with. The first line to be electrified was the Sirkeci-Halkalı line on the İstanbul commuter railway. Three electric locomotives were ordered from Alsthom and Jeumont from France as well as several sets of multiple units. Electrification was complete and electric train started to run on December 4, 1955. The electrification got many positive reactions. In 1969, TCDD electrified the Haydarpaşa–Gebze part of the commuter railway in İstanbul. Several more sets of E8000 emus were ordered as well as 15 E40000 electric locomotives to meet the demands of the railway. The Ankara Suburban Railway was electrified in 1972 and brand new E14000 multiple units were ordered. 

With the success of electrifying suburban lines, the State Railways turned to electrify important main lines. The main reason for this is that tough gradients would be easier to climb with electric traction than steam or diesel traction. On February 6, 1977, TCDD finished the electrification as well as major earthworks of the Gebze-Adapazarı part of the İstanbul–Adapazarı main line. The State Railway then turned to electrify the entire İstanbul-Ankara main line, to try to save its diminishing reputation. Construction started in 1987. Forty-five E43000 electric locomotives were ordered from Toshiba and built in Eskişehir by Tülomsaş, to be used on the line. Electrification was completed between Arifye and Eskişehir and electric trains began to run in 1989. Electrification was connected to Ankara in 1993. The major ore route between Divriği and İskenderun was electrified in 1994 to make it easier for heavy trains to go up steep gradients. İstanbul to Edirne and Kapıkule was electrified in 1997 and 15 new E52500 electric locomotives were delivered from ASEA in 1998. In an attempt to revive İzmir's suburban network, Alsancak-Cumaovası and Basmane-Aliağa lines were electrified in 2001 and 2002 respectively. However these were not used at all. In 2006 the wires were taken down and the line was re-electrified completely between 2006 and 2010. This line opened on August 30, 2010, between Alsancak-Cumaovası and October 29, 2010, between Alsancak and Aliağa.

Future plans
Almost 1500 km of track was planned to be completely electrified in 2020.

See also 
Electricity sector in Turkey

References

Sources

Turkey
Rail infrastructure in Turkey